Sieboldius is a genus of dragonflies in the family Gomphidae. The genus occurs in Asia and is closely related to the Dragonhunter Hagenius brevistylus of North America.

The genus contains the following species:
Sieboldius albardae 
Sieboldius alexanderi  - Small Dragonhunter
Sieboldius deflexus 
Sieboldius gigas 
Sieboldius herculeus 
Sieboldius japponicus 
Sieboldius maai 
Sieboldius nigricolor

References

Gomphidae
Taxa named by Edmond de Sélys Longchamps
Anisoptera genera